In cryptography, the Double Ratchet Algorithm (previously referred to as the Axolotl Ratchet) is a key management algorithm that was developed by Trevor Perrin and Moxie Marlinspike in 2013. It can be used as part of a cryptographic protocol to provide end-to-end encryption for instant messaging. After an initial key exchange it manages the ongoing renewal and maintenance of short-lived session keys. It combines a cryptographic so-called "ratchet" based on the Diffie–Hellman key exchange (DH) and a ratchet based on a key derivation function (KDF), such as a hash function, and is therefore called a double ratchet.

The algorithm is considered self-healing because under certain conditions it prevents an attacker from accessing the cleartext of future messages after having compromised one of the user's keys. New session keys are exchanged after a few rounds of communication. This effectively forces the attacker to intercept all communication between the honest parties, since they lose access as soon as a key exchange occurs that is not intercepted. This property was later named Future Secrecy, or Post-Compromise Security.

Etymology 

"Axolotl" was in reference to the salamander's self-healing properties. The term "ratchet" in cryptography is used in analogy to a mechanical ratchet. In the mechanical sense, a ratchet only allows advancement in one direction; a cryptographic ratchet only allows keys to be generated from the previous key. Unlike a circular ratchet, however, each state is unique.

Origin 
The Double Ratchet Algorithm was developed by Trevor Perrin and Moxie Marlinspike (Open Whisper Systems) in 2013 and introduced as part of the Signal Protocol in February 2014. The Double Ratchet Algorithm's design is based on the DH ratchet that was introduced by Off-the-Record Messaging (OTR) and combines it with a symmetric-key ratchet modeled after the Silent Circle Instant Messaging Protocol (SCIMP). The ratchet was initially named after the critically endangered aquatic salamander axolotl, which has extraordinary self-healing capabilities. In March 2016, the developers renamed the Axolotl Ratchet as the Double Ratchet Algorithm to better differentiate between the ratchet and the full protocol, because some had used the name Axolotl when referring to the Signal Protocol.

Properties 
The Double Ratchet Algorithm features properties that have been commonly available in end-to-end encryption systems for a long time: encryption of contents on the entire way of transport as well as authentication of the remote peer and protection against manipulation of messages. As a hybrid of DH and KDF ratchets, it combines several desired features of both principles. From OTR messaging it takes the properties of forward secrecy and automatically reestablishing secrecy in case of compromise of a session key, forward secrecy with a compromise of the secret persistent main key, and plausible deniability for the authorship of messages. Additionally, it enables session key renewal without interaction with the remote peer by using secondary KDF ratchets. An additional key-derivation step is taken to enable retaining session keys for out-of-order messages without endangering the following keys.

It is said to detect reordering, deletion, and replay of sent messages, and improve forward secrecy properties in comparison to OTR messaging.

Combined with public key infrastructure for the retention of pregenerated one-time keys (prekeys), it allows for the initialization of messaging sessions without the presence of the remote peer (asynchronous communication). The usage of triple Diffie–Hellman key exchange (3-DH) as initial key exchange method improves the deniability properties. An example of this is the Signal Protocol, which combines the Double Ratchet Algorithm, prekeys, and a 3-DH handshake. The protocol provides confidentiality, integrity, authentication, participant consistency, destination validation, forward secrecy, backward secrecy (aka future secrecy), causality preservation, message unlinkability, message repudiation, participation repudiation, and asynchronicity. It does not provide anonymity preservation, and requires servers for the relaying of messages and storing of public key material.

Functioning 

A client renews session key material in interaction with the remote peer using Diffie–Hellman ratchet whenever possible, otherwise independently by using a hash ratchet. Therefore, with every message a client using the double ratchet advances one of two hash ratchets (one for sending, one receiving) which get seeded with a common secret from a DH ratchet. At the same time it tries to use every opportunity to provide the remote peer with a new public DH value and advance the DH ratchet whenever a new DH value from the remote peer arrives. As soon as a new common secret is established, a new hash ratchet gets initialized.

As cryptographic primitives, the Double Ratchet Algorithm uses
 for the DH ratchet
 Elliptic curve Diffie–Hellman (ECDH) with Curve25519,
 for message authentication codes (MAC, authentication)
 Keyed-Hash Message Authentication Code (HMAC) based on SHA-256,
 for symmetric encryption
 the Advanced Encryption Standard (AES), partially in Cipher Block Chaining mode (CBC) with padding as per PKCS #5 and partially in Counter mode (CTR) without padding,
 for the hash ratchet
 HMAC.

Applications 

The following is a list of applications that use the Double Ratchet Algorithm or a custom implementation of it:

 ChatSecure
 Conversations
 Cryptocat
 Facebook Messenger
 G Data Secure Chat
 Gajim
 GNOME Fractal
 Google Allo
 Google Messages
 Haven
 Pond
 Element
 Signal
 Silent Phone
 Skype
 Viber
 WhatsApp
 Wire

Notes

References

Literature

External links 
 Specification by Open Whisper Systems
 "Advanced cryptographic ratcheting", abstract description by Moxie Marlinspike
 Olm: C++ implementation under the Apache 2.0 license
 Vodozemac: Rust implementation of the Olm variation, under the Apache 2.0 license

Cryptographic algorithms